Joan Haggerty (born 26 April 1940) is a Canadian novelist.

Born in Vancouver, British Columbia, she studied English and Theatre at the University of British Columbia. From 1962 to 1972, she lived in
London, England; Formentera, Spain; and New York City.  She now lives in Telkwa, B.C. above the Widzin'kwa River.

Literary career

Please, Miss, Can I Play God? Notes and Sketches based on an adventure in dramatic play. Methuen, London, 1966.  Bobbs-Merrill, NYC, 1966.

 

Joan Haggerty's first book is an early 1960s exploration of creative drama in an east end London, England elementary school.  As a young teacher, she discovers that children learn best through play; by acting out their interpretations of the classics and developing their own dramas, they come to embrace the institutions of theatre as their own.

Daughters of the Moon.  Bobbs-Merrill, NYC, 1971.

Set in Spain and England, Daughters of the Moon is a novel told from the point of view of a woman in labour.  It begins with the first contraction and ends with the birth.  Each contraction expands the protagonist's consciousness into the realm of touch and memory; the story unfolds in shifting dimensions of time and space as she re-lives the moments that bring the arrival of her daughter.

The Invitation: A Memoir of Family Love and Reconciliation. Douglas & McIntyre, Vancouver/Toronto, 1994.

The Invitation is a memoir about the author's son, her second child, who grew up with a couple in Paris. It tells the story of their reunion in France and their later visits in Vancouver, B.C. It was nominated for Governor General's Award in 1994.

The Dancehall Years. Mother Tongue Publishing Ltd., Saltspring Island, B.C., 2016.

Both an epic adventure and an interracial drama, this complex family saga begins one summer on Bowen Island and in Vancouver during the Depression and moves through Pearl Harbour, the evacuation of the Japanese and three generations into the 1980s.

Bibliography
Please, Miss, Can I Play God? - 1966
Daughters of the Moon - 1971
The Invitation: A Memoir of Family Love and Reconciliation - 1994 (nominated for a Governor General's Award)
The Dancehall Years - 2016

References

1940 births
20th-century Canadian novelists
Canadian women novelists
Living people
People from the Regional District of Bulkley-Nechako
Writers from Vancouver
20th-century Canadian women writers